The Copper Queen Hotel is a historic hotel located in Bisbee, Arizona.

Holding the distinction of being Arizona's longest continuously operated hotel, the Copper Queen was constructed from 1898 to 1902 by the Phelps Dodge Corporation to serve as lodging for investors and dignitaries visiting its nearby copper mine.

Television 
The Copper Queen is allegedly haunted and has been featured on at least two paranormal investigation shows; the third season of Ghost Hunters and the sixth season of Ghost Adventures.

Perhaps the most famous ghost is that of a woman in her 30s by the name of Julia Lowell. It is said that she was a prostitute and she used the hotel for her and her clients. She fell madly in love with one of her clients; when she told him of her feelings he no longer wanted to see her, and she took her own life at the hotel. Guests and staff at the hotel say that they feel her presence on the second and third floors of the west side of the building. Male staff and guests have reported hearing a female voice whispering in their ear. Others have also reported seeing her dancing provocatively at the foot of the stairs.

The hotel was the subject of an episode of the Travel Channel show Resort Rescue. The episode featured a drunken streaker running around the hotel at midday.

References

External links

Buildings and structures in Cochise County, Arizona
Hotels in Arizona
Hotel buildings completed in 1902
1902 establishments in Arizona Territory
Reportedly haunted locations in Arizona
Bisbee, Arizona